is a railway station in the village of Kariwa, Niigata, Japan, operated by East Japan Railway Company (JR East).

Lines
Kariwa Station is served by the Echigo Line and is 9.9 kilometers from the terminus of the line at Kashiwazaki Station.

Station layout
The station consists of one ground-level side platform serving a single bi-directional track.

The station is unattended. Suica farecard cannot be used at this station.

History
Kariwa Station opened on 11 November 1912. A new station building was completed in 1984. With the privatization of Japanese National Railways (JNR) on 1 April 1987, the station came under the control of JR East.

Surrounding area
Kariwa Village Hall
Kariwa Post Office
Kariwa Shell Midden
Kashiwazaki-Kariwa Nuclear Power Plant

See also
 List of railway stations in Japan

References

External links

 JR East station information 

Railway stations in Niigata Prefecture
Railway stations in Japan opened in 1912
Echigo Line
Stations of East Japan Railway Company
Kariwa, Niigata